Mount Adams is a mountain in Western Australia.

References

Mountains of Western Australia